John Stanton (8 March 1901 – 27 June 1973) was an English cricketer. He played for Gloucestershire between 1921 and 1922.

References

1901 births
1973 deaths
English cricketers
Gloucestershire cricketers
Cricketers from Bristol